Bolette is a feminine given name. Notable people with the name include:

Bolette Gjør (1835–1909), Norwegian writer and missionary
Anne Bolette Holsen (1856–1913), Norwegian teacher and women's rights activist
Bolette Roed (born 1979), Danish musician
Bolette Sutermeister Petri (1920–2018), Danish-Swiss travel writer

See also
Bolete, a mushroom 

Feminine given names